The 1953 BYU Cougars football team was an American football team that represented Brigham Young University (BYU) as a member of the Skyline Conference during the 1953 college football season. In their fifth season under head coach Chick Atkinson, the Cougars compiled an overall record of 2–7–1 with a mark of 1–5–1 against conference opponents, tied for seventh in the Skyline, and were outscored by a total of 228 to 172.

The team's statistical leaders included LaVon Satterfield with 682 yards of total offense (114 rushing, 568 passing), Reed Stolworthy with 473 rushing yards, and Dick Felt with 30 points scored.

Schedule

References

BYU
BYU Cougars football seasons
BYU Cougars football